Zeno is a surname. Notable people with the surname include:

 Ana María Zeno (1922–2011), Argentine professor and gynaecologist
 Antonio Zeno (1326–1402), Venetian navigator
 Antonio Zeno (bishop) (died 1530), Italian Roman Catholic bishop
 Apostolo Zeno (1669–1750), Italian poet
 Carlo Zeno (1333–1418), Venetian admiral
 Giovanni Battista Zeno (1440–1501), Venetian cardinal
 Joseph Zenon (1900–1968), American musician
 Marco Zeno (1585–1641), Italian Roman Catholic bishop
 Mohamed Al Zeno (born 1983), Syrian footballer
 Muhammad bin Jamil Zeno (1922–2010), Syrian islamicist
 Nicolò Zeno (fl. 1558), Venetian cartographer
 Nicolò Zeno (died 1403), Venetian navigator
 Pietro Zeno (died 1427), Venetian lord of Andros and Syros
 Reniero Zeno (fl. 1240–1268), Doge of Venice
 Thierry Zéno (born 1950), Belgian filmmaker
 Tony Zeno (born 1957), American basketball player

See also 

 Zeno (disambiguation)
 Zeno (name)
 Zeni (surname)